

Events
August 9, 2006 - Co Adriaanse resigns as manager of Porto
August 16, 2006 - Jesualdo Ferreira is announced as the new manager of the champions Porto
August 19, 2006 - Porto defeats Vitória de Setúbal 3–0 in Leiria to win the SuperCup Cândido de Oliveira with Rui Barros commanding the team
August 23, 2006 - Courts confirm that Belenenses will play instead of Gil Vicente due to the Mateus affair. The following days met much controversy: the day the league started, it was still not known which teams would play in the major league.
August 25-August 28, 2006 - The Primeira Liga and Liga de Honra seasons begin.
September 1, 2006 - The Portugal national team plays its first game since the 2006 FIFA World Cup, against Denmark
September 3, 2006 - The Taça de Portugal and the Second Division seasons begin.
September 10, 2006 - The Terceira Divisão season begins
September 17, 2006 - The Serie Azores of the Third Division begins in the archipelago of the Azores

Transfer deals

Major summer transfers
The summer transfer window runs from the end of the previous season until 31 August.

May 13, 2006
 Adriano from Cruzeiro to Porto, €1.2M fee
May 17, 2006
 Hilário from Nacional to Chelsea, free transfer
May 21, 2006
 Diego from Porto to Werder Bremen, €6M
May 25, 2006
 Rui Costa from Milan to Benfica, free transfer
May 27, 2006
 Zé Castro from Académica to Atlético Madrid, undisclosed fee
June 2, 2006
 João Pinto from Boavista to Braga, free transfer
June 6, 2006
 Geovanni from Benfica to Cruzeiro, €1.5M

June 7, 2006
 Przemysław Kaźmierczak from Pogoń Szczecin to Boavista, on loan
June 13, 2006
 Roland Linz from Austria Wien to Boavista, undisclosed fee
June 22, 2006
 Pontus Farnerud from Strasbourg to Sporting CP, free transfer
 Kostas Katsouranis from AEK Athens to Benfica, €2M
July 4, 2006
 Carlos Paredes from Reggina to Sporting CP
July 9, 2006
 Mário Jardel from Goiás to Beira-Mar
July 11, 2006
 Laurent Robert from Benfica to Levante
 Tarik Sektioui from AZ to Porto
 Hugo Almeida from Porto to Werder Bremen

UEFA competitions

Honours

National team
The Selecção played its first game against Denmark in September, losing to the Northern European side. After that friendly, the national team started its qualification for UEFA Euro 2008 with a draw against Finland.

Key
 H = Home match
 A = Away match
 N = Neutral field
 F = Friendly
 ECQ = European Championship Qualifier

Notes

 
Seasons in Portuguese football
Football
Football
Portuguese football